Mortal Kombat is an American media franchise centered on a series of video games originally developed by Midway Games in 1992. The development of the first game was originally based on an idea that Ed Boon and John Tobias had of making a video game starring Jean-Claude Van Damme, but when that idea fell through, a science fantasy-themed fighting game was created instead. Still, the developers paid homage to him with Johnny Cage (one of the main characters in the franchise), a fictional film star whose personal style resembles Van Damme's. 

The original game spawned many sequels with several action-adventure games. It also has a comic book series and a card game. Movie producer Larry Kasanoff licensed the rights to the game in the early 1990s and produced the first movie of the franchise. Kasanoff also produced the second movie, animated TV series, live-action TV series movies, the first one million platinum-selling album, and a live-action tour. Mortal Kombat has become the best-selling fighting game franchise worldwide and one of the highest-grossing media franchises of all time.

The series has a reputation for high levels of graphic violence, including, most notably, its fatalities, which are finishing moves that kill the defeated opponents instead of knocking them out. Controversies surrounding Mortal Kombat, in part, led to the creation of the Entertainment Software Rating Board (ESRB) video game rating system. Early games in this series were also noted for their realistic digitized sprites and an extensive use of palette swapping to create new characters. Following Midway's bankruptcy, the MK development team was acquired by Warner Bros. Entertainment and reestablished as NetherRealm Studios.

Gameplay

The original three games and their updates, Mortal Kombat (1992), Mortal Kombat II (1993), Mortal Kombat 3 (1995), Ultimate Mortal Kombat 3 (1995), and Mortal Kombat Trilogy (1996), were 2D fighting games. The arcade cabinet versions of the first two used a joystick and five buttons: high punch, low punch, high kick, low kick, and block; Mortal Kombat 3 and its updates added a sixth "run" button. Characters in the early Mortal Kombat games play virtually identically to one another, with the only major differences being their special moves. Through the 1990s, the developer and publisher Midway Games kept their single-styled fighting moves with four attack buttons for a different array of punches, kicks and blocks. Mortal Kombat: Deadly Alliance 
was the first Mortal Kombat game in which the characters could move in three dimensions, and Mortal Kombat 4 was the first to use 3D computer graphics. From Deadly Alliance to Mortal Kombat: Deception, characters had three fighting styles per character: two unarmed styles, and one weapon style. While most of the styles used in the series are based on real martial arts, some are entirely fictitious. Goro's fighting styles, for example, are designed to take advantage of the fact that he has four arms. For Armageddon, fighting styles were reduced to a maximum of two per character (generally one hand-to-hand combat style and one weapon style) due to the sheer number of playable characters. Mortal Kombat vs. DC Universe dropped multiple fighting styles for most characters in favor of giving each character a wider variety of special moves 2011's Mortal Kombat returned to a single 2D fighting plane, although characters are rendered in 3D; unlike previous MK games, each of the controller's four attack buttons corresponds to one of the character's limbs, the buttons thus becoming front punch, back punch, front kick and back kick ("front" indicates the limb that is closer to the opponent, and "back" indicates the limb that is farther away from the opponent). This concept takes heavy inspiration from Tekken.

Mortal Kombat: Deception and Mortal Kombat: Armageddon feature "Konquest", a free-roaming action-adventure mode that significantly expanded on the single-player experience. Both games also include distinct minigame modes such as "Chess Kombat", an action-strategy game similar to Archon. Two other bonus minigames, "Puzzle Kombat" inspired by Puzzle Fighter and "Motor Kombat" inspired by Mario Kart, feature super deformed versions of Mortal Kombat characters. The games also contain various unlockable content and hidden "cheats".

Finishing moves

One of the most notable features of the Mortal Kombat series is its brutal and gruesome finishing moves, known as "Fatalities". 
The basic Fatalities are finishing moves that allow the victorious characters to end a match by murdering their defeated, defenseless opponent. Usually Fatalities are exclusive to each character, the exception being Mortal Kombat: Armageddon, which instead features Kreate-A-Fatality, a feature that allows players to perform their own Fatalities by conducting a series of violent moves chosen from a pool that is common to all characters.

Other finishing moves in the various Mortal Kombat games include Animalities (introduced in Mortal Kombat 3), in which the victor turns into an animal to violently finish off the opponent; Brutality (introduced in Ultimate Mortal Kombat 3) which consists of bashing the opponent into pieces with a long combo of hits; and Stage Fatalities/Death Traps (introduced in the original Mortal Kombat Pit Stage where the victor can uppercut their opponent off of the platform into a bed of spikes below, later made more difficult in Mortal Kombat II by requiring a character-specific button sequence) utilizing parts of certain stages to execute a lethal finishing move (such as a pool of acid). Mortal Kombat: Deception added the Hara-Kiri, a move that allows the loser to perform a suicidal finishing move, giving way to a potential race between both players to see if the winner can finish off their opponent before they can kill themselves.

There are also two non-violent finishing moves in the series, which were introduced in Mortal Kombat II as a satire to the outrage the first game caused due to its violent content. Friendship moves, which result in a display of friendship towards the enemy instead of slaughter, and Babalities, which turn the opponent into a baby.

Plot 
The series takes place in a fictional universe consisting of numerous realms which, according to in-game backstories, were created by an ancient, eternal, and ethereal pantheon of preternatural divine beings, known as the Elder Gods. The Mortal Kombat: Deception manual described six of the realms as: "Earthrealm, home to such legendary heroes as Liu Kang, Kung Lao, Sonya Blade, Johnny Cage, and Jax Briggs, and also under the protection of the Thunder God Raiden; Netherrealm, the fiery depths of which are inhospitable to all but the most vile, a realm of demons and shadowy warriors such as Quan Chi and Noob Saibot; Outworld, a realm of constant strife which Emperor Shao Kahn claims as his own; Seido, the Realm of Order, whose inhabitants prize structure and order above all else; the Realm of Chaos, whose inhabitants do not abide by any rules whatsoever, and where constant turmoil and change are worshiped; and Edenia, which is known for its beauty, artistic expression, and the longevity of its inhabitants." The Elder Gods decreed that the denizens of one realm could only conquer another realm by defeating the defending realm's greatest warriors in ten consecutive martial arts tournaments, called Mortal Kombat.

The first Mortal Kombat game takes place in Earthrealm (Earth) where seven different warriors with their own reasons for entering the tournament with the prize being the continued freedom of their realm under threat of a takeover by Outworld. Among the established warriors were Liu Kang, Johnny Cage, and Sonya Blade. With the help of the thunder god Raiden, the Earthrealm warriors were victorious, and Liu Kang became the new champion of Mortal Kombat. In Mortal Kombat II, unable to deal with his minion Shang Tsung's failure, Outworld Emperor Shao Kahn lures the Earthrealm warriors to Outworld for a do-over, winner-take-all tournament, where Liu Kang eventually defeats Shao Kahn. By the time of Mortal Kombat 3, Shao Kahn merged Edenia with his empire and revived its former queen Sindel in Earthrealm, combining it with Outworld as well. He attempts to invade Earthrealm, but is ultimately defeated by Liu Kang once more. After the Kahn's defeat, Edenia was freed from his grasp and returned to a peaceful realm, ruled by Princess Kitana. The following game, Mortal Kombat 4, features the fallen elder god Shinnok attempting to conquer the realms and kill Raiden. However, he is also defeated by Liu Kang.

In Mortal Kombat: Deadly Alliance, the evil sorcerers Quan Chi and Shang Tsung join forces to conquer the realms, killing series protagonist Liu Kang in the process. By Mortal Kombat: Deception, after several fights, the sorcerers emerge victorious; having killed most of Earthrealm's warriors until Raiden steps forth to oppose them. The Dragon King Onaga, former ruler of Outworld, returned to merge all realms back together, but was eventually defeated by the game's protagonist, Shujinko.

In Mortal Kombat: Armageddon, the titular catastrophe begins. Centuries before the first Mortal Kombat, Queen Delia foretold the realms would be destroyed because the power of all of the realms' warriors would rise to such greatness that it would overwhelm and destabilize the realms, triggering a destructive chain of events. King Argus had his sons, Taven and Daegon put into incubation and so one day they can be awakened to save the realms from Armageddon by defeating a firespawn known as Blaze. In the end however, Shao Kahn is the one who defeats Blaze and wins the war, causing Armageddon.

The crossover Mortal Kombat vs. DC Universe does not share continuity with the other games. After the simultaneous defeats of both Shao Kahn and the alien warlord Darkseid in the DC Universe causes both villains to fuse into the entity "Dark Kahn", both the Mortal Kombat and DC Universes begin to merge. This brings the warriors and heroes into conflicts after suffering bouts of uncontrollable rage. The heroes and villains of both universes repeatedly battle each other, believing each other to be responsible for the catastrophe, until only Raiden and Superman remain. The two confront Dark Kahn and team up to defeat their common foe. After Dark Kahn's defeat, the two realms defuse, with Shao Kahn and Darkseid trapped in each other's universes to face eternal imprisonment.

In the 2011 Mortal Kombat soft reboot, the battle of Armageddon culminated in only two survivors: Shao Kahn and Raiden. On the verge of death by the former's hand, the latter sent visions to his past self in a last-ditch attempt to prevent this outcome. Upon receiving the visions, the past Raiden attempts to alter the timeline to avert Armageddon amidst the tenth Mortal Kombat tournament, during the original game. His attempts to alter history mean that events play out differently to the original series. While he succeeds in preventing Shao Kahn's victory with help from the Elder Gods, he accidentally kills Liu Kang in self-defense and loses most of his allies to Queen Sindel; leaving Earthrealm vulnerable to Shinnok and Quan Chi's machinations.

Mortal Kombat X sees Shinnok and Quan Chi enacting their plan, leading an army of undead revenants of those that were killed in Shao Kahn's invasion of Earthrealm. A team of warriors led by Raiden, Johnny Cage, Kenshi Takahashi, and Sonya Blade oppose them, and in the ensuing battle, Shinnok is imprisoned within his amulet and various warriors are resurrected and freed from his control, though Quan Chi escapes. Twenty-five years later, the sorcerer resurfaces alongside the insectoid D'Vorah to facilitate Shinnok's return. A vengeful Scorpion kills Quan Chi, but fails to stop him from freeing Shinnok. To combat him, Cassie Cage, daughter of Johnny Cage and Sonya Blade, leads a team composed of the next generation of Earthrealm's heroes in defeating him. With Shinnok and Quan Chi defeated, Liu Kang and Kitana's revenants assume control of the Netherrealm while Raiden taps into Shinnok's amulet.

Mortal Kombat 11 and its expansion, Aftermath, sees the architect of time and Shinnok's mother, Kronika, working to alter the timeline following her son's defeat and Raiden's tampering with her work. In doing so, she brings past versions of the realm's heroes to the present, aligning herself with some while the rest work to defeat her. After nearly killing Liu Kang a second time, Raiden discovers Kronika has manipulated them into fighting across multiple timelines as she fears their combined power. Despite her interference and attacks by her minions, Raiden gives Liu Kang his power, turning him into a god of fire and thunder so he can defeat Kronika. In the Aftermath expansion, it is revealed that Liu Kang inadvertently destroyed Kronika's crown, the item needed to restart the timeline. Her defeat also revives Shang Tsung, who was absent in the base game due to his imprisonment by Kronika. To recover the crown, Liu Kang sends Shang Tsung and other Earthrealm heroes back in time to obtain it before Kronika, though Shang Tsung manipulates events so that he comes into possession of the crown. At the end, either Liu Kang or Shang Tsung becomes the Keeper of Time, depending on the player's choice (who they want to fight with in the final battle) and the outcome of the battle.

Characters

Through its iterations, the series has featured scores of player characters, some of them becoming mainstays, such as Baraka, Cassie Cage, Cyrax, Ermac, Fujin, Goro, Jade, Jax, Johnny Cage, Kabal, Kano, Kenshi, Kintaro, Kitana, Kung Lao, Liu Kang, Mileena, Motaro, Nightwolf, Noob Saibot, Quan Chi, Raiden, Rain, Reptile, Scorpion, Sektor, Shang Tsung, Shao Kahn, Sheeva, Shinnok, Sindel, Skarlet, Smoke, Sonya Blade, Stryker, Sub-Zero and Tanya. Among them are Earth's humans and cyborgs, good and evil deities, and denizens of Outworld and other realms.

Furthermore, starting with Mortal Kombat vs. DC Universe, which featured several DC Universe heroes and villains, all subsequent games have included guest characters such as Freddy Krueger from A Nightmare on Elm Street franchise, Kratos from the God of War franchise (exclusively for Play Station 3), Jason Voorhees from the Friday the 13th franchise, the Alien, Leatherface from the Texas Chainsaw Massacre franchise, the Predator, the Terminator, RoboCop, Spawn from Image Comics, John Rambo and the Joker from DC Comics, who was previously in Mortal Kombat vs. DC Universe.

Development

Origins
Mortal Kombat started development in 1991 with only four people: Ed Boon (programming), John Tobias (art and story), John Vogel (graphics), and Dan Forden (sound design). According to Mortal Kombat actors Richard Divizio and Daniel Pesina, the first game actually began as a ninja-themed project by John Tobias (a young new employee of Midway Games at the time) and them as well as Carlos Pesina, however their pitch to Tobias' boss Ed Boon was rejected by the entire management of Midway. Midway was then abortively approached to create a video game adaptation of the then-upcoming 1992 film Universal Soldier, starring Jean-Claude Van Damme, and Tobias imagined a fighting game featuring a digitized version of Van Damme. Intending to make a game "a lot more hard edge, a little bit more serious, a little bit more like Enter the Dragon or Bloodsport" than contemporary cartoonish fighting games, Tobias and Boon decided to continue their project even after the deal to use the Bloodsport license fell through. The first of Mortal Kombat characters, Johnny Cage (Daniel Pesina), became "a spoof on the whole Van Damme situation." Divizio credits himself with convincing Tobias to go back to the original idea and trying again.

It was the success of Capcom's Street Fighter II: The World Warrior that finally convinced Midway Games to let the team produce their own arcade fighting game (the genre chosen by Tobias for his game as to let him use as large digitized sprites as possible), but there was not much influence by Street Fighter II on the actual project. According to Tobias, who cited 1984's Karate Champ as an actual inspiration, they even intentionally worked on making a game different than Capcom's title in every way. Besides the digitized characters that differentiated it from its contemporaries' hand-drawn ones, one stark difference was in the very high amount of blood and violence. Capcom's senior director of communications later compared Street Fighter and Mortal Kombat by asking if the interviewer preferred the "precision and depth" of Street Fighter or the "gore and comedy" of Mortal Kombat and also stated that the Street Fighter and Mortal Kombat rivalry was considered similar to the Coke and Pepsi rivalry in the 1990s.

John Tobias said that his inspirations for the game's story and characters came from Chinese mythology and some of the stories and rumored events about the Shaolin monks. Regarding the film Big Trouble in Little China, Tobias wrote that although this movie "kind of Americanized my obsession for supernatural kung fu films from China, it was not my biggest influence. My biggest influences came from Tsui Hark films -- Zu Warriors & The Swordsman. We had to get them from bootleggers in Chicago's Chinatown." In 1995, he said about their general process of designing characters for the series: "First we figure out the type, like she or he and will she/he be big or small. Then we'll get the theme of the characters, like ninja or robot. Then we'll design the costume, and while doing that we create the storyline and how s/he fits into the universe. Then we'll find an actor that kinda resembles our character." Tobias' writing and artistic input on the series ended around 2000 following the release of Mortal Kombat 4. In 2012, he said: "I knew exactly what I was going to do with a future story. A few years ago, I [wrote] a sort of sequel to the first MK film and an advancement to the game's mythological roots."

The title Mortal Kombat was the idea of pinball designer Steve Ritchie, following difficulties trademarking the original title of Mortal Combat. Since then, the series often intentionally misspells various words with the letter "K" in place of "C" for the hard C sound. According to Boon, during the MK games' development they usually spell such words correctly, only making the substitution when one of the developers suggests it.

Graphics 
The characters of the original Mortal Kombat and its initial sequels were created using digitized sprites mostly based on filmed actors, as opposed to hand-drawn graphics.  Mortal Kombat games were known for their extensive use of palette swapping, which was used for the ninja characters. In fact, many of the most popular characters have originated as simple palette swaps. In the first game, the male ninja fighters were essentially the same character; only the colors of their attire, fighting stance, and special techniques mark a difference. Later games added further ninjas based on the same model, as well as several female ninja color swap characters initially also using just one base model. All of them gradually became very different characters in the following installments of the series. Eventually, Mortal Kombat 4 brought the series into 3D, replacing the digitized fighters of previous games with polygon models animated using motion capture technology.

Hidden content

Most Mortal Kombat games included secret characters, secret games, and other Easter eggs. The original Mortal Kombat was the first fighting game to introduce a secret fighter in Reptile, reached if the player fulfilled an obscure set of requirements. Future games would continue the trend of hidden characters. There is also a hidden game of Pong in Mortal Kombat II, and Mortal Kombat 3 includes a hidden game of Galaga. Many extras in the series have only been accessible through very challenging, demanding, and sometimes coincidental requirements. The Sega Mega Drive/Genesis versions contain a unique finisher, named "Fergality". The Sega CD version also contained an additional code (known as the "Dad's Code"), which changed the names of the fighters to that of characters from the classic BBC comedy series Dad's Army.

Some Easter eggs originated from in-jokes between members of the development team. One example is "Toasty", which found its way into the game in the form of a small image of sound designer Dan Forden, who would appear in the corner of the screen during gameplay (after performing an uppercut) and yell the phrase "Toasty!", originating from him saying "you're toast". This egg was also the key to unlocking the hidden character Smoke when it happened in the Portal stage in Mortal Kombat II. In Mortal Kombat 4, Forden would say "Toasty! 3D!" after Scorpion did his burn Fatality, a reference to the fact that it is the first 3D game of the series. "Toasty!" is also found in Mortal Kombat: Shaolin Monks, appearing randomly after the character pulls off a chain of hits, though the picture of Forden was removed for that title, but brought back for the 2011 Mortal Kombat game. Yet another private joke was the hidden character Noob Saibot, who has appeared in various versions of the game starting with Mortal Kombat II. The character's name derived from two of the series' creators' surnames, Ed Boon and John Tobias, spelled backwards. In addition, a counter for ERMACS on the game's audits screen (ERMACS being short for error macros), was interpreted by some players as a reference to a hidden character in the original Mortal Kombat. The development team decided to turn the rumor into reality, introducing Ermac in Ultimate Mortal Kombat 3 as an unlockable secret character. The hidden character Mokap, introduced in Mortal Kombat: Deadly Alliance, is a tribute to Carlos Pesina, who played Raiden in MK and MKII and has served as a motion capture actor for subsequent titles in the series.

Games

Main series
The original Mortal Kombat game was released by Midway in arcades during October 1992, and has since been ported to several console and home computer systems, with early ports released by Acclaim Entertainment. The sequel, Mortal Kombat II, was released for arcades in 1993, featuring an increased roster and improved graphics and gameplay, then ported to the numerous home systems in 1993–1995, released again by Acclaim. Mortal Kombat 3 followed in 1995 in both arcade and home versions. MK3 received two updates which expanded the number of characters and other features from the game: Ultimate Mortal Kombat 3, released that same year in arcades, and Mortal Kombat Trilogy, released for home consoles the following year. The following game, Mortal Kombat 4, was released in 1997, and marked the jump of the series to 3D rendered graphics instead of the digitized 2D graphics used in previous games. Mortal Kombat 4 was ported to the PlayStation, Nintendo 64 and Microsoft Windows. Its updated version titled Mortal Kombat Gold was released exclusively for the Dreamcast in 1999.

At this point that the series started being targeted at consoles only, with Mortal Kombat 4 being the last game in the series to be released for the arcades. Also the series' naming scheme changed to favor the use of sub-titles instead of numbered installments, beginning with Mortal Kombat: Deadly Alliance in 2002. Deadly Alliance was released initially for the Xbox, PlayStation 2 and GameCube. Deadly Alliance was also the first Mortal Kombat game to feature fully 3D gameplay, where up to Mortal Kombat 4 the gameplay had stayed in a 2D plane; this trend would continue for the following two games.

The next sequel was 2004's Mortal Kombat: Deception, released for the PlayStation 2, Xbox, and GameCube. Its port for the PlayStation Portable, Mortal Kombat: Unchained, was released in 2006. Mortal Kombat: Armageddon was published in 2006 for the PlayStation 2, Xbox, and in 2007 for the Wii.

Mortal Kombat vs. DC Universe, a crossover fighting game between the Mortal Kombat franchise and DC Comics, was released in 2008 for the PlayStation 3 and Xbox 360.

A ninth game in the series, a reboot titled simply Mortal Kombat, was developed by the former Midway Games, now known as NetherRealm Studios. It was first released for the PlayStation 3 and Xbox 360 in 2011, and was ported to the PlayStation Vita in 2012 and to the Microsoft Windows in 2013. Downloadable content became a feature of games in the series at this time. Its first sequel, Mortal Kombat X, was released in 2015 on PlayStation 4, Xbox One, and Microsoft Windows, and marked a return to numbered sequels. This was paired with the first Mortal Kombat game for tablet and smartphone computers, Mortal Kombat Mobile. A follow-up, Mortal Kombat 11, was released in 2019 for the PlayStation 4, Xbox One, Nintendo Switch, and Microsoft Windows. A sequel, Mortal Kombat 12, is set for release in 2023.

Spin-off games 
Besides the fighting games, there are three action-adventure titles that work as spin-offs from the Mortal Kombat storyline. Mortal Kombat Mythologies: Sub-Zero was released in 1997 for the PlayStation and Nintendo 64; its story is focused on the first incarnation character of Sub-Zero and is focused in the timeline before the first Mortal Kombat game. The next action game was Mortal Kombat: Special Forces, released in 2000 for the PlayStation, starring Major Jackson Briggs in his mission to destroy the Black Dragon. Both games were critically panned (although the reception of Mythologies was more mediocre). Mortal Kombat: Shaolin Monks, developed by Midway Studios Los Angeles, was released in 2005 for the PlayStation 2 and the Xbox, starring Liu Kang and Kung Lao and telling an alternate version of the events between the first and second Mortal Kombat games. A similar game entitled Mortal Kombat: Fire & Ice, which was to star Scorpion and again Sub-Zero, was canceled when the developers of Shaolin Monks "couldn't do it in time and under budget". On October 18, 2022, Mortal Kombat: Onslaught was announced; it's a role-playing game scheduled for a 2023 release for Android and iOS. NetherRealm said it will be a cinematic experience and also it will be loyal to its core visceral nature.

Other media

Films

Animated

An animated prequel to 1995's Mortal Kombat film, titled Mortal Kombat: The Journey Begins, was released direct-to-video in the same year as the live-action film.

A series of direct-to-video films subtitled Mortal Kombat Legends began in 2020 as a co-production between Warner Bros. Animation and either Studio Mir or Digital eMation. The first, Mortal Kombat Legends: Scorpion's Revenge, was released in April 2020, as the first ever R-rated Mortal Kombat film. The second film, Mortal Kombat Legends: Battle of the Realms, was released in August 2021. The third film, Mortal Kombat Legends: Snow Blind was released on October 11, 2022. A fourth film, Mortal Kombat Legends: Cage Match, is set to release in 2023. The films in the series have received mixed-to-positive reviews from critics and fans.

Live-action

Mortal Kombat was adapted into two major motion pictures, Mortal Kombat (1995) and Mortal Kombat: Annihilation (1997), both released by New Line Cinema. The first film was released on August 18, 1995, grossing $23 million on its first weekend. Despite mixed reviews from critics, Mortal Kombat became a financial success, eventually grossing approximately $70 million in the U.S. and over $122 million worldwide; the film also gained a cult following amongst fans of the video game series with :Robin Shou, Linden Ashby, Cary-Hiroyuki Tagawa, Bridgette Wilson, Talisa Soto and Christopher Lambert starring, and its success launched the Hollywood career of its director, Paul W. S. Anderson. However, this momentum did not carry over into the movie's sequel, Mortal Kombat: Annihilation, which was directed by John R. Leonetti with Shou and Soto as the only two returning from the first film. The film received a poor reception by critics and fans alike, grossing only $36 million in the U.S. and $51 million worldwide, a disappointing result when compared with the first film.

In 2010, director Kevin Tancharoen released an eight-minute Mortal Kombat short film, titled Mortal Kombat: Rebirth, made as a proof of concept for Tancharoen's pitch of a reboot movie franchise to Warner Bros. Pictures. Tancharoen later confirmed that the unofficial short featured the writing of Oren Uziel, who at the time was rumored to be writing the screenplay for a third Mortal Kombat movie. In September 2011, New Line and Warner Bros. announced that Tancharoen had signed on to direct a new feature-length film from a screenplay written by Uziel, with the intention of aiming for an R rating. Shooting was expected to begin in March 2012 with a budget of well under $100 million (projected at between $40–50 million) and a release date of 2013, but was ultimately delayed due to budget constraints. Tancharoen quit the production in October 2013.

A reboot, Mortal Kombat (2021), was released on April 23, 2021 to mixed reviews, grossing over $84 million worldwide from theaters while also releasing simultaneously on the streaming service HBO Max. Production restarted on a reboot in 2015 when James Wan joined to produce and director Simon McQuoid joined the following year. The script was written by Greg Russo and David Callaham with Lewis Tan, Jessica McNamee, Josh Lawson, Tadanobu Asano, and Hiroyuki Sanada starring. A sequel is in development with McQuoid returning as director and Jeremy Slater set to write the screenplay.

 Cole Young was introduced as the protagonist of the 2021 film and had not featured in a Mortal Kombat game at the time.

Print media

Comics

A number of Mortal Kombat comic books were based on the video game series, including the official Mortal Kombat and Mortal Kombat II comic, books created by Tobias and advertised in the attract modes on early versions of the first two games. In 1994, Malibu Comics launched a licensed Mortal Kombat comic book series, spawning two six-issue series (Blood and Thunder and Battlewave), along with several miniseries and one-shot special issues dedicated to specific characters, until its publication ended in August 1995. Two more comics were also made as tie-ins for Mortal Kombat 4 and Mortal Kombat vs. DC Universe, and a new miniseries titled Blood Ties was published prior to the release of Mortal Kombat X in 2015.

Novels
Jeff Rovin penned a novelization of the first Mortal Kombat game, which was published in 1995 in order to coincide with the release of the movie, though the novel did not follow the movie plot. Novelizations of both Mortal Kombat movies were written by Martin Delrio and Jerome Preisler. Two paperback novels by C. Dean Andersson entitled Mortal Kombat: Reptile's World and Shango's Thunder were written but never published due to the publishing company not securing the rights from Midway.

Music

Mortal Kombat: The Album, a techno album based on the first game, was created for Virgin America by Lords of Acid members Praga Khan and Oliver Adams as The Immortals in 1994. Its iconic theme "Techno Syndrome", incorporating the "Mortal Kombat!" yell first shown in the Mortal Kombat commercial for home systems, was first released in 1993 as a single and was also used as a theme music for the Mortal Kombat film series. Each movie had their own soundtracks (including the hit and award-winning compilation album Mortal Kombat: Original Motion Picture Soundtrack), as had the second video game (Mortal Kombat II: Music from the Arcade Game Soundtrack). The 2011 video game saw the release of Mortal Kombat: Songs Inspired by the Warriors, a new soundtrack album featuring electronic music by various artists.

Television

Animated

An animated series titled Mortal Kombat: Defenders of the Realm was released in 1996. It ran for one season.

Live-action

In 1998, Mortal Kombat: Conquest was released. It lasted only one season. In 2010, Warner Premiere ordered a web series inspired by the Rebirth short, titled Mortal Kombat: Legacy and also directed by Kevin Tancharoen. The series' first season was released for free on YouTube starting in April 2011, promoted by Machinima.com, and the second season arrived in 2013.

In 2014, Blue Ribbon Content have been developing a live-action series that was to tie in with Mortal Kombat X for a planned 2016 release, titled Mortal Kombat: Generations. The series, however, was not released.

Stage show

A stage show titled Mortal Kombat: Live Tour was launched at the end of 1995, expanded to 1996, and featured Mortal Kombat characters in a theatrical display on stage.

Collectible card games

Brady Games produced the collectible card game Mortal Kombat Kard Game in 1996. Score Entertainment's 2005 collectible card game Epic Battles also used some of the Mortal Kombat characters.

Interactive stock trading game 
The Mortal Kombat: Federation of Martial Arts was Threshold Entertainment's answer to the restrictions of the franchise involving the Midway Game Mortal Kombat. The challenge was to create a game that successfully promoted the video game without competing against it. The answer we developed was to use a stock market investing game model attached to an active online community to generate interest. The community discussion built every week leading to a big fight that would play out in installments over the weekend. This allowed players to essentially bet on their favorites by purchasing more stock prior to a fight and then hoping that their stock would go up in battle if their player won.

Reception

Sales 
Mortal Kombat has been one of the most successful fighting game franchises in video game history, previously only trailing Bandai Namco's Tekken, Capcom's Street Fighter, and Nintendo's Super Smash Bros. As of 2021, it has surpassed the competitor fighting game franchises in worldwide lifetime series sales. It generated more than $4 billion by the late 1990s and $5 billion in total revenue by 2000. A particularly successful game was Mortal Kombat II, which had unprecedented opening week sales figures never seen before in the video game industry, for the first time beating the box office numbers of summer hit films. The Mortal Kombat games, however, have not been localized in Japan after the Super Famicom release of Mortal Kombat II, due to content guidelines against depictions of blood, gore and dismemberment (Tobias blaming their "very americanized" character design).

Mortal Kombat games have sold more than 6 million units by 1994 and 26 million by 2007, and the figure has exceeded 30 million by 2012. As of 2022, the franchise had sold about 79 million units.

Ratings, reviews, and awards 
The 2008 edition of Guinness World Records Gamer's Edition awarded the Mortal Kombat series with seven world records, including "most successful fighting game series". The franchise holds ten world records in the 2011 Guinness World Records Gamer's Edition, including the "largest promotional campaign for a fighting video game" (Mortal Kombat 3), "highest grossing film based on a beat ‘em up video game" (Mortal Kombat 1996), and "most successful video game spin-off soundtrack album" (Mortal Kombat: Original Motion Picture Soundtrack).

Numerous publications described it as one of the most important and also most violent series in the history of video games; in 2011, the staff of GameSpy wrote "its place in fighting game history is undeniable". In 2009, GameTrailers ranked Mortal Kombat as the ninth top fighting game franchise as well as the seventh bloodiest series of all time. In 2012, Complex ranked Mortal Kombat as 37th best video game franchise overall, commenting on its "legendary status in video game history". Mortal Kombat as a series was also ranked as the goriest video game ever by CraveOnline in 2009 and by G4tv.com in 2011; including it on their list of the goriest games, Cheat Code Central commented that "Mortal Kombat had enough gore to simultaneously offend a nation and change gaming forever."

Legacy and cultural impact
According to IGN, during the 1990s "waves of imitators began to flood the market, filling arcades with a sea of blood from games like Time Killers, Survival Arts, and Guardians of the Hood. Mortal Kombat had ushered in an era of exploitation games, both on consoles and in arcades, all engaging in a battle to see who can cram the most blood and guts onto a low-res screen." Notable Mortal Kombat clones, featuring violent finishing moves and/or digitized sprites, included Bio F.R.E.A.K.S., BloodStorm, Cardinal Syn, Catfight, Eternal Champions, Kasumi Ninja, Killer Instinct, Mace: The Dark Age, Primal Rage, Street Fighter: The Movie, Tattoo Assassins, Thrill Kill, Ultra Vortek, Way of the Warrior, and Midway's own War Gods. John Tobias commented: "Some of the copycat products back then kind of came and went because, on the surface level, the violence will attract some attention, but if there's not much to the product behind it, you're not going to last very long."

In a 2009 poll by GamePro, 21% of voters chose Mortal Kombat as their favorite fighting game series, ranking it third after Street Fighter and Tekken. In 2012, Capcom's Street Fighter producer Yoshinori Ono said he is getting a lot of requests for Street Fighter vs. Mortal Kombat and understands why people want it, "but it's easier said than done. Having Chun Li getting her spine ripped out, or Ryu's head bouncing off the floor...it doesn't necessarily match." In 2014, martial artist Frankie Edgar opined Mortal Kombat has been far superior to Street Fighter.

The series and its characters are also referenced in the various other works of popular culture, such as in the title of Powerglove's debut album Metal Kombat for the Mortal Man and the Workaholics episode "Model Kombat". According to Complex in 2012, "Years ago, MK became a phenomenon far outside gaming circles alone. Its name has become recognizable enough to be name dropped on sitcoms (Malcolm in the Middle and Married... with Children), found in movies (Christian Slater plays MK4 in Very Bad Things), and used as part of cultural studies (see Justine Cassell and Henry Jenkins' book From Barbie to Mortal Kombat: Gender and Computer Games)." It was also featured in the film Doom Generation. The name "Mortal Kombat" was even given to a dangerous illegal recreational drug that was introduced and caused multiple fatalities in early 2014.

In 2012, Tobias said: "If you look at any other pop culture phenomenon—like if you look at the Teenage Mutant Ninja Turtles, for instance—it became popular at the time right around when Mortal Kombat became popular, and it had its highs and lows, and here they are once again talking about a major motion picture. That's because of its place in pop culture. It's always there for someone to pick up, polish off, blow the dust off of it, and re-release it. And Mortal Kombat will always be that way. It'll be around 50 years from now."

Competitive play 
Fighting games have been a popular genre among tournaments since the late 90s. Mortal Kombat has its place in some of the world's biggest fighting game tournaments including Evo and Combo Breaker, as well as many local and online tournaments around the world. Since the 2011 Mortal Kombat game was released, the game has been one of the most popular games at these events. Between 2014 and 2017, the game was mostly absent from the tournament scene, due to NetherRealm Studios being focused on their Injustice series as their top priority; Mortal Kombat games returned to Combo Breaker in 2018.

Controversies

The series was subject of a major video game controversy and several court cases, largely related to its extremely violent content, especially in relation to the original game which paved a way for the introduction of the ESRB (Entertainment Software Rating Board) game rating system in 1994 as well as the Australian Classification Board. Various games in the series, as well as advertisements for them, have been censored or banned in a number of countries. According to SuperData Research CEO Joost van Dreunen, "Because of the obvious rift between gamers on the one hand and adult society on the other, Mortal Kombat set the tone for what constituted gamer culture."

In Germany, every Mortal Kombat game was banned for ten years from its release until 2015. Mortal Kombat (2011) is also banned in South Korea, and was banned in Australia until February 2013. MK11 is banned in Indonesia, Japan, China and Ukraine.

See also
 DC Universe
 List of best-selling video game franchises
 List of fighting games
 Happy Tree Friends

References

External links
 
  (Warner Bros.)
 Mortal Kombat Wiki at Fandom
 Mortal Kombat at MobyGames
 "The History of Mortal Kombat video series

 
Articles which contain graphical timelines
Fighting video games by series
Hell in popular culture
Mythopoeia
Video game franchises introduced in 1992
Video game franchises
Video games about demons
Video games adapted into comics
Video games adapted into films
Video games adapted into television shows
Video games about parallel universes
Warner Bros. Games franchises
Fiction about murder